The 1979 Kansas City Chiefs season was the franchise's 10th season in the National Football League, the 17th as the Kansas City Chiefs, and the 20th overall. They improved on their 4-12 record from 1978 to a 7–9 record, but a last-place finish in the AFC West. The Chiefs missed the playoffs for the eighth straight year due to the four other teams ahead of them in their division all finishing with winning records.

Kansas City owned a pair of picks in the first round of the 1979 Draft, selecting defensive end Mike Bell and quarterback Steve Fuller. By the season's third game, Fuller had supplanted Mike Livingston as the club's starter.

With Fuller at the helm, the Chiefs owned a 4–2 record after six games, but a five-game midseason losing streak ended the attempt. Despite finishing fifth in the AFC West for a second straight season, Kansas City's 7–9 record was a notable accomplishment considering the fact that the division's other four clubs all posted winning records for a second consecutive season.

The Chiefs closed the season by dropping a 3–0 decision at Tampa Bay on December 16 in one of the most water-logged contests in franchise annals. As both clubs struggled to move the ball under monsoon-like conditions (Kansas City was held to 80 total yards), a field goal late in the fourth quarter by the Buccaneers' Neil O'Donoghue averted the NFL's first scoreless tie since 1943, allowing Tampa Bay to win the NFC Central division championship after a three-game losing streak.

The Chiefs set a dubious NFL record for the season, with the fewest passing yards (1,660, 103.8 per game) in a 16-game season.

Offseason

NFL Draft

Roster

Schedule

Preseason

Regular season

Game summaries

Week 1: vs. Baltimore Colts

Week 2: vs. Cleveland Browns

Week 3: at Houston Oilers

Week 4: vs. Oakland Raiders

Week 5: at Seattle Seahawks

Week 6: at Cincinnati Bengals

Week 7: vs. Denver Broncos

Week 8: vs. New York Giants

Week 9: at Denver Broncos

Week 10: vs. San Diego Chargers

Week 11: vs. Pittsburgh Steelers

Week 12: at Oakland Raiders

Week 13: at San Diego Chargers

Week 14: vs. Seattle Seahawks

Week 15: at Baltimore Colts

Week 16: at Tampa Bay Buccaneers

Standings

Awards and records 
 Bob Grupp, NFL Leader, Punting, 43.6 average yards per punt

References 

Kansas City Chiefs
Kansas City Chiefs seasons
Kansas